Fernbach is a surname. Notable people with the surname include:

 Anton Fernbach-Ferenczi (also known as Antal Ferenczi) (1925–1989), Romanian footballer and football manager
 Auguste Fernbach (1860-1939), French biologist
 C. W. Fernbach (1915–1967), Austrian actor
 Franz Xaver Fernbach, politician
 Henry Fernbach (1829—1883), American architect 
 Johannes Fehring, originally Fernbach (1926–2004), Austrian jazz-musician
 Sidney Fernbach (1917-1991), American physicist

See also
 Fernbach flask
 Sidney Fernbach Award